Tibiella is an extinct genus of gastropods belonging to the family Creseidae. 

Fossils of the species of this genus are found in Northern America.

Species:

 †Tibiella annulata 
 † Tibiella marshi 
 †Tibiella reflexa 
 †Tibiella taxana 
 †Tibiella texana 
 †Tibiella watupuruensis

References

External links
 O. (1884). Notes on Tertiary shells. Proceedings of the Academy of Natural Sciences of Philadelphia. 36: 104-112
 Garvie C.L. & Goedert J.L. & Janssen A.W. (2020). Paleogene and Late Cretaceous Pteropoda (Mollusca, Gastropoda, Heterobranchia) from North America. Zootaxa. 4782(1): 1-115.

Creseidae
Prehistoric gastropod genera